Puff pastry, also known as , is a flaky light pastry made from a laminated dough composed of dough and butter or other solid fat. The butter is put inside the dough (or vice versa), making a  that is repeatedly folded and rolled out before baking.

The gaps that form between the layers left by the fat melting are pushed (leavened) by the water turning into steam during the baking process.

History

Modern puff pastry was created in France. The oldest known recipe for puff pastry in France was written in a charter by bishop Robert of Amiens in 1311. But the technique is considered the idea of the famous painter Claude Gellée when he was an apprentice baker in 1612. The story goes that Lorrain was making a type of very buttery bread for his sick father, and the process of rolling the butter into the bread dough created a croissant-like finished product. The modern French puff pastry was then developed and improved by the chef M. Feuillet and Antonin Carême.

While modern puff pastry was invented in France, Arabs and Greeks have used a different kind of puff pastry for many centuries, similar to Greek phyllo. They create separated thin sheets of dough spread with olive oil and use them in different kind of pastries like baklava.

Puff pastry also has a long history in Spain, perhaps through Arab or Moorish influences: the first known recipe of puff pastry using butter or lard and following the Arab technique of making each layer separately, appears in the Spanish recipe book  (Book on the art of cooking) written by Domingo Hernández de Maceras and published in 1607. Maceras, the head cook in one of the colleges of the University of Salamanca, already distinguished between filled puff pastry recipes and puff pastry tarts, and even mentions leavened preparations. Francisco Martínez Motiño, head chef to Philip II of Spain (1527–1598), also gave several recipes of puff pastry in his  published in 1611. In this book, puff pastry is abundantly used, particularly to make savoury game pies. In his novel El Buscón (published in 1627 but written in 1604), the Spanish writer Francisco de Quevedo caustically suggests that the puff pastry pies sold at the inn of some Simón de Paredes in Madrid were being adulterated with human flesh.

Production

The production of puff pastry dough can be time-consuming, because it must be kept at a temperature of approximately 16 °C (60 °F) to keep shortening from becoming runny, and must rest in between folds to allow gluten strands time to link up and thus retain layering.

The number of layers in puff pastry is calculated with the formula:

 

For example, twice-folding (i.e. in three), repeated four times gives  layers. Chef Julia Child recommends 73 layers for regular pâte feuilletée and 729 (i.e. 36) layers for pâte feuilletée fine (in Volume II of her Mastering the Art of French Cooking textbook).

Commercially made puff pastry is available in grocery stores. Common types of fat used include butter, vegetable shortenings, lard and margarine. Butter is the most common type used because it provides a richer taste and superior mouthfeel. Shortenings and lard have a higher melting point therefore puff pastry made with either will rise more than pastry made with butter, if made correctly. Puff pastry made in this manner will, however, often have a waxy mouthfeel and more bland flavor. Specialized margarine formulated for high plasticity (the ability to spread very thin without breaking apart) is used for industrial production of puff pastry.

Variants and distinctions

Since the process of making puff pastry is generally laborious and time-intensive, faster recipes are fairly common: known as "blitz", "rough puff", or "flaky pastry". Many of these recipes combine the butter into the  rather than adding it in the folding process and are thus similar to a folded short crust.

Puff pastry can also be leavened with baker's yeast to create croissants, Danish pastry, Spanish milhoja, or Portuguese empanadilla; though such preparations are not universally considered puff pastries.

Puff pastry differs from phyllo (filo) pastry, though puff pastry can be substituted for phyllo in some applications. Phyllo dough is made with flour, water, and fat and is stretched to size rather than rolled. When preparing phyllo dough, a small amount of oil or melted fat (usually butter) is brushed on one layer of dough and is topped with another layer, a process repeated as often as desired.  When the phyllo bakes it becomes crispy, but since it contains somewhat less water, does not expand to the same degree as puff pastry.  Puff pastry also differs from Austrian strudel dough, or Strudelteig, which more closely resembles phyllo.

Uses

 Beef Wellington
 Cheese straws
 Croline
 Croissants
 Galette des rois
 Jambons
 Miguelitos
 Mille-feuille
 Palmier
 Pastel de nata
 Pithivier
 Sausage rolls
 Steak and kidney pie and other types of pie
 Strudel
 Tarte conversation
 Tarte Tatin
 Torpedo dessert
 Turnovers

See also

 List of butter dishes
 List of pastries
 Rustico (pastry)

References

External links
 Preparing Puff Pastry (a visual guide)

 
Doughs
Foods featuring butter
Pastries